The spiny long-footed rat (Tarsomys echinatus), also known as the Mindanao spiny rat, is a species of rodent in the family Muridae.

It is found only in Mindanao, Philippines, in Bukidnon and South Cotabato provinces. It has been recorded in lowland areas around Mount Kitanglad and Mount Matutum.

References

Tarsomys
Mammals described in 1992
Taxonomy articles created by Polbot